Ali Sher Hyderi  (Urdu: علی شیر حیدری; died 17 August 2009) was the leader of the politico-religious organisation  Sipah-e-Sahaba Pakistan, a Deobandi  organization, which was officially banned by the government of Pakistan in August 2001.On 26 June 2018, Pakistan lifted the ban.

Biography
He was born into a Uyghur family, with his father Muhammad, from Kashgar, and mother Emina, from Khairpur.They have 11 children, where Ali Sher was the 6th.

He was born in 1963 in Khairpur.

He joined Sipah-e-Sahaba Pakistan and later became its chief in October 2003.

On 17 August 2009, he was shot dead by unknown people in Khairpur District.

References

2009 deaths
Deobandis
Pakistani religious leaders
History of Islam in Pakistan
Religiously motivated violence in Pakistan
Shia–Sunni sectarian violence
Deaths by firearm in Pakistan
Assassinated Pakistani Islamic scholars
Assassinated religious leaders
Sipah-e-Sahaba Pakistan people
Chiefs of Sipah-e-Sahaba Pakistan
People from Khairpur District